Usun (Uhun) is a rural locality (a selo), the only inhabited locality, and the administrative center of Kyuletsky 1-y Rural Okrug in Vilyuysky District of the Sakha Republic, Russia, located  from Vilyuysk, the administrative center of the district. Its population as of the 2010 Census was 801, up from 743 recorded during the 2002 Census.

Facilities
It has a high school, agricultural enterprise, kindergarten, shop, communication center, district hospital, bank.

References

Notes

Sources
Official website of the Sakha Republic. Registry of the Administrative-Territorial Divisions of the Sakha Republic. Vilyuysky District.

External links
Weather
Weather details
News
WikiMapia

Rural localities in Vilyuysky District